Center Township is a township in Butler County, Pennsylvania, United States. The population was 7,898 at the 2010 census.

Geography
Center Township is located at the geographic center of Butler County, just north of Butler Township and the city of Butler, the county seat. It contains the unincorporated communities of Unionville and Shanor-Northvue, both census-designated places.

Pennsylvania Route 8 is the main road through the township, leading south into Butler and north to Franklin. Connoquenessing Creek flows through the southeastern part of the township.

Demographics

As of the census of 2000, there were 8,182 people, 3,333 households, and 2,346 families residing in the township.  The population density was 334.7 people per square mile (129.2/km2).  There were 3,482 housing units at an average density of 142.4/sq mi (55.0/km2).  The racial makeup of the township was 98.1% White, 0.4% African American, 0.6% Asian, 0.1% from other races, and 0.4% from two or more races. Hispanic or Latino of any race were 0.3% of the population.

There were 3,333 households, out of which 28.6% had children under the age of 18 living with them, 60.7% were married couples living together, 7.2% had a female householder with no husband present, and 29.6% were non-families. 26.3% of all households were made up of individuals, and 13.0% had someone living alone who was 65 years of age or older.  The average household size was 2.42 and the average family size was 2.93.

In the township the population was spread out, with 22.0% under the age of 18, 6.6% from 18 to 24, 26.7% from 25 to 44, 26.8% from 45 to 64, and 17.9% who were 65 years of age or older.  The median age was 42 years. For every 100 females there were 93.1 males.  For every 100 females age 18 and over, there were 88.9 males.

The median income for a household in the township was $42,406, and the median income for a family was $50,731. Males had a median income of $42,443 versus $25,473 for females. The per capita income for the township was $21,790.  About 2.9% of families and 5.8% of the population were below the poverty line, including 6.8% of those under age 18 and 6.2% of those age 65 or over.

Economy 
Center Township is served by the Clearview Mall, featuring 70+ stores and anchored by Boscov's.

References

External links
Township website

Populated places established in 1804
Townships in Butler County, Pennsylvania